The Spingold national bridge championship is held at the summer American Contract Bridge League (ACBL) North American Bridge Championship (NABC).

The Spingold is a knock-out team event that attracts the top contract bridge players in the world. The event typically lasts seven days with each day being a round consisting of four sessions of 16 boards. The event is open and seeded.

History

The Spingold Master Knockout Teams, first known as the Challenge Knockout Teams, was contested for the Asbury Park Trophy in the early days. The runner-up team in the regularly scheduled portion of the event had the right to challenge the winners to a playoff. This right was never utilized.

In 1934, 1936 and 1937, the Masters Teams-of-Four and the Asbury Park Trophy were separate events, providing two sets of winners. In 1938 the event became the Spingold Master Knockout Teams and a part of the Summer NABC.  At one time, the Spingold was a double elimination event, usually lasting nine or 10 sessions. It was scored by International Match Points and was restricted to players with 100 or more masterpoints.  In 1965, the double elimination method was replaced by three qualifying sessions (subsequently reduced to two), followed by single elimination knockout matches. The preliminary qualifying sessions were dropped in 1970.

The Spingold Trophy, donated by Nathan B. Spingold in 1934, is one of ACBL's most highly prized team trophies. The event, which attracts virtually all of the world's best bridge players, is widely considered one of the toughest events in the world. Many bridge aficionados consider the modern day Spingold tougher to win than a World Championship.

Winners

Nick Nickell's professional teams won the Spingold nine times in 15 years from 1993 to 2007, including four in a row without change in personnel (intact) from 1993 to 1996, and two more 1998–99 after one change. The four-time winners were Nickell, Richard Freeman, Bob Hamman, Bobby Wolff, Jeff Meckstroth, and Eric Rodwell. Paul Soloway replaced Wolff and played on the other five Nickell champions, over ten years.

The champion has defended its title intact on four other occasions, 1965, 1971, 2002, and 2012.

The winners in 2011-12 and the winners and runner up in 2014 and 2015 each had two players who were later disqualified for cheating, this casting doubt on the integrity of those performances.

See also
Reisinger Board-a-Match Teams
Vanderbilt Knockout Teams

References

Other sources
 List of previous winners, Pages 10, 11. 

 

North American Bridge Championships